Clubul Sportiv Universitatea Cluj-Napoca is a Romanian professional rugby union club from Cluj-Napoca, which currently plays in the Liga Națională de Rugby, the top tier in Romania operated by the Romanian Rugby Federation..

Honours
Liga Națională de Rugby:
Third place (4) : 1995, 1996, 1998, 2003
Cupa României 
Runners-up (3): 1998, 1999, 2002

Current squad

 Senior 15s internationally capped players are listed in bold.

See also
 Rugby union in Romania

External links
 Official website
 Main fans website
 SuperLiga Squad Details
 Squad Details
 PlanetaOvala.ro - Romanian Rugby News

Sport in Cluj County
Sport in Cluj-Napoca
Romanian rugby union teams
Rugby clubs established in 1949
1949 establishments in Romania